Ivan Nelipčić (1344–1379) or Ivan II Nelipić, was a Croatian magnate, the knez of Cetina, gospodar of Sinj, a member of the Nelipić family. He was the son of Ivan Nelipić (d. 1344) and Vladislava Kurjaković. With Margareta Merini from Split, he had a son, knez Ivaniš, and daughter, Jelena.

References

1344 births
1379 deaths
Nelipčić
Nelipić
Nelipčić
Nelipčić